Tania Yolanda Medina Collado (born April 14, 1982) is a plastic surgeon and beauty queen from the Dominican Republic. In March 2022, she was included in People en Español magazine's list of the 25 most powerful women.

Biography

Beauty contests and modeling 
Medina participated in Miss Dominican Republic US in 2000 and in Miss Millennium Universe, representing the Dominican Republic, in 2001. The same year she participated in Miss American Continent, where she was first runner-up. In 2006 she participated in Miss Dominican Republic, representing La Romana. She became a semifinalist and became in the seventh position. The same year, she entered Miss Mundo Dominicana 2006, where he finished in third position.

She has participated in numerous television programs in media such as Univisión, Telemundo, People, among others. In addition, she has appeared on the covers or in the pages of magazines such as Harper's Bazaar, Glamour, L'Officiel and Elle. In 2022 she presented her first book, entitled La belleza de amarme.

Medical career 
She studied medicine at the School of Medicine of the Technological Institute of Santo Domingo (INTEC). She graduated as a specialist from the National Residency in Aesthetic and Reconstructive Plastic Surgery at the Dr. Salvador Gautier Hospital.
 
She is a member of the Dominican Medical Association and a candidate member of the Dominican Society of Plastic, Reconstructive and Aesthetic Surgery (SODOCIPRE). She is also part of the Staff of National Private Aesthetic Plastic Surgeons, Reconstructive.

Personal life 
Medina married Pablo García, a general surgeon, in 2007. The couple has four children: Daniella, Letizia, Paula and Pablo.

References

External links
Official website

1982 births
Living people
Dominican Republic surgeons
Miss Dominican Republic
Dominican Republic beauty pageant winners